The Metropolitan Intercollegiate Conference was an American intercollegiate athletic conference that existed from 1972 to 1984. The league had members in the state of New York.

Members
The following is an incomplete list of the membership of the Metropolitan Intercollegiate Conference.

Football champions
 1972 – 
 1973 – 
 1974 – 
 1975 – 
 1976 – 
 1977 – 
 1978 – 
 1979 – 
 1980 – 
 1981 – 
 1982 – 
 1983 – 
 1984 –

Football standings

See also
 List of defunct college football conferences

References